Christian Lee may refer to:
 Christian Lee (footballer)
 Christian Lee (fighter)